Laurynas Grigelis and Mohamed Safwat were the defending champions but chose not to defend their title.

Roman Jebavý and Andrej Martin won the title after defeating Dino Marcan and Antonio Šančić 6–4, 6–2 in the final.

Seeds

Draw

References
 Main Draw

Morocco Tennis Tour - Casablanca II - Doubles